Chandan Sinha is a Bangladeshi playback singer. He was awarded the 2013 Bangladesh National Film Award for Best Male Playback Singer for his performance in the film Purno Doirgho Prem Kahini. He was the producer of the sequel Purno Doirgho Prem Kahini 2.

Sinha's grandfather was Nutan Chandra Singha. Sinha's father was Gaurang Sinha, who died on 30 December 2015. 

Chandan Sinha left home for Bollywood at a young age to pursue his dream of being a playback singer. He was unsuccessful there, so he returned home. He then came to the attention of Bangladesh Television (BTV) writer and director Abdullah al Mamun. Mamun used Sinha's voice in his television serial Shirsho Bindu.

Awards
 Uro Binodon Bichitra Award for Drama Title of Joar Bhata (2003)
 Citycell-Channel i Music Award (2015)

References

External links
 

Living people
21st-century Bangladeshi male singers
21st-century Bangladeshi singers
Bangladeshi Hindus
Bangladeshi playback singers
Best Male Playback Singer National Film Award (Bangladesh) winners
Year of birth missing (living people)